James Atkinson (1886 – after 1910) was an English professional footballer who played as an inside forward or wing half in the Football League for Bolton Wanderers.

Life and career
Atkinson was born in 1886 in Manchester, and was playing Manchester League football for Newton Heath Athletic by the age of 15. He moved on to Sale Holmefield, had a trial with Manchester United that came to nothing, then signed for Bolton Wanderers in March 1905. He scored on his debut in the First Division a year later, but played only twice more in the league before spending the 1908–09 Southern League season as Brighton & Hove Albion's regular left half. A season with another Southern League club, Exeter City, followed, and he then joined Barrow of the Lancashire Combination.

References

1886 births
Year of death missing
Footballers from Manchester
English footballers
Association football inside forwards
Association football wing halves
Newton Heath Athletic F.C. players
Sale Holmefield A.F.C. players
Bolton Wanderers F.C. players
Brighton & Hove Albion F.C. players
Exeter City F.C. players
Barrow A.F.C. players
English Football League players
Southern Football League players